Kim Ki-Suk (born September 2, 1980) is a South Korean boxer who won a gold medal at the 2002 Asian Games. He also participated in two Olympics.

Career
At the 2000 Olympics he won two matches at light flyweight before losing to eventual winner Brahim Asloum 8:12.

At the 2002 Asian Games in Busan in his home country he won the gold medal.

At the Olympics 2004 he fought at flyweight but ran into Thai star Somjit Jongjohor in his very first match and lost on points (12:22). He qualified for the Athens Games by winning the silver medal at the 2004 Asian Amateur Boxing Championships in Puerto Princesa, Philippines. In the final he was defeated by home fighter Violito Payla.

External links

yahoo

1980 births
Living people
Olympic boxers of South Korea
Boxers at the 2000 Summer Olympics
Boxers at the 2004 Summer Olympics
Asian Games medalists in boxing
Boxers at the 2002 Asian Games
South Korean male boxers
Asian Games gold medalists for South Korea
Medalists at the 2002 Asian Games
Flyweight boxers